Capitol Heights is an island-platformed Washington Metro station in Capitol Heights, Maryland, United States. The station was opened on November 22, 1980, and is operated by the Washington Metropolitan Area Transit Authority (WMATA). Providing service for the Blue and Silver Lines, the station is located at 133 Central Avenue in a residential area at East Capitol Street and Southern Avenue SE. This is the first station on the two lines in Maryland going east. As of 2017, in terms of weekday average boardings, it is the least used underground station in the system and the 10th least used station overall.

History

In December 2012, Capitol Heights was one of five stations added to the route of the Silver Line, which was originally supposed to end at the Stadium-Armory station, but was extended into Prince George's County, Maryland to the Largo Town Center station (the eastern terminus of the Blue Line) due to safety concerns about a pocket track just past Stadium-Armory. Silver Line service at Capitol Heights began on July 26, 2014.

In 1997, Radisson station of the Montreal Metro’s Green Line was redressed to stand in for Capitol Heights in the Bruce Willis movie The Jackal.

Station layout

References 

 The Capitol Heights in the movie The Jackal : https://www.imdb.com/title/tt0119395/locations (portrayed by Radisson metro station in Montreal)

External links

 The Schumin Web Transit Center: Capitol Heights Station
 Southern Avenue entrance from Google Maps Street View

Stations on the Blue Line (Washington Metro)
Stations on the Silver Line (Washington Metro)
Washington Metro stations in Maryland
Railway stations in the United States opened in 1980
1980 establishments in Maryland
Railway stations located underground in Maryland